At least two ships of the French Navy have been named César:

  a 74-gun  launched in 1768 and sunk in 1782
  a 74-gun  launched in 1807, ceded to the Netherlands in 1814 and renamed Prins Frederik .She was broken up in 1821

French Navy ship names